Metz (formerly, Chalone) is an unincorporated community in the Salinas Valley, in Monterey County, California.

History
The first European land exploration of Alta California, the Spanish Portolá expedition, camped in this vicinity on September 27, 1769, having followed the Salinas River from the south.

A post office operated at Metz from 1888 to 1933.

The place was originally called Chalone when the railroad was built to the site in 1886. Upon the establishment of the post office, the settlement was renamed Metz in honor of W.H.H. Metz, its first postmaster.

References

Unincorporated communities in Monterey County, California
Salinas Valley
Unincorporated communities in California